Chinocossus is a genus of moths in the family Cossidae.

Species
 Chinocossus acronyctoides (Moore, 1879)
 Chinocossus greeni (Arora, 1976)
 Chinocossus hunanensis (Daniel, 1940)
 Chinocossus marcopoloi Yakovlev, 2006
 Chinocossus vjet Yakovlev, 2006

References

 , 2006, New Cossidae (Lepidoptera) from Asia, Africa and Macronesia, Tinea 19 (3): 188-213.
 , 2009: The Carpenter Moths (Lepidoptera:Cossidae) of Vietnam. Entomofauna Supplement 16: 11-32.

External links
Natural History Museum Lepidoptera generic names catalog

Cossinae
Moth genera